Top Dollar is the debut solo album of percussionist Larry Mullins recorded under his moniker Toby Dammit, released on June 12, 2001, through Omplatten.

Track listing

Personnel 
Adapted from the Top Dollar liner notes.

Larry Mullins (as Toby Dammit) – drums, percussion, vocals, arrangements, production, engineering
Musicians
Bertrand Burgalat – R.M.I. Electric Harpsichord, production
Kate Fenker (as Wanda Dammit) – vocals (1, 3)

Production and additional personnel
Doug Henderson – engineering, mixing
Johan Kugelberg – production
Frank Longo – art direction
Matt Merman – mastering
Dave Sardy – mixing

Release history

References

External links 
 

2001 debut albums
Toby Dammit albums